Liophlaeothrips is a genus of thrips in the family Phlaeothripidae.

Species
 Liophlaeothrips acaciae Tyagi & Kumar, 2011
 Liophlaeothrips cecidii Ananthakrishnan, 1964
 Liophlaeothrips pavettae Ananthakrishnan & Jagdish

References

Thrips genera
Phlaeothripidae